Ṛtusaṃhāra, often written Ritusamhara, (Devanagari: ऋतुसंहार; ऋतु , "season"; संहार , "compilation") is a medium length Sanskrit poem. 

While the poem is often attributed to Kalidasa, modern scholars disagree with this traditional attribution. According to Siegfried Lienhard "the Ṛtusaṃhāra is almost certainly the work of some poet whose name has not come down to us and was probably written sometime between Asvaghosa (about 100 A.D.) and Kalidasa (4th to 5th century)." 

The word Ritu (seasons) with the word saṃhāra is used here in the sense of "coming together" or "group". Thus, Ritusamhara has been translated as Medley of Seasons or Garland of Seasons, perhaps more aptly as the "Pageant of the Seasons", but also mistranslated as "birth and death" of seasons, which arises from the alternate meaning of samhāra as destruction.

The evocative poetry is in the popular Anustubh Chanda form of four line stanzas- a total of 144 stanzas. This was the first Sanskrit text to be printed and published in Calcutta (Kolkata) in 1792. The changing seasons are portrayed in acute details using the thematic backdrop of how lovers react differently to the changing landscapes- the two themes beautifully accentuating each other. This imbues the poem with distinctly amorous taste(shringara) rasa. The predominant emphasis on a single rasa has been criticized by some, however it showcases the latent virtuosity of the neophyte poet, as he explores the range of flavors (Svad) within the single rasa rasa- an exuberant exposition of joie de vivre, conveyed through the interplay of changing nature and steady romance.

Sometimes his authorship has been challenged on the grounds of weak poetic imagination. As an example, here is verse 1.4 of Grishma, where the lovers are struggling against the heat: 
 	To relieve their lovers of heat,
 	Women make them lie
 	On their girdled, round hips covered with silken robes, or
 	On their sandal anointed breasts
 	Heavy with ornaments.
 	They seek help from fragrant flowers
 	Set in coiffures after a bath,
 	To intoxicate and delight their lovers.
Of these verses (4-9 of Grishma canto) the Mysore scholar K. Krishnamurthy says: 
 The sensuality and cloying love depicted in these verses is such that it cannot bring fame to any poet.
However, others have cited the primacy of shringara rasa (considered as a primeval source for other rasas), and also the balance the poet seeks to achieve by setting the lovers against the background of nature, as redeeming features of the work.

Simple evocations of changing seasons intersperse the more colorful ones:

The summer scorched forest is thrilled with joy at the touch of new showers, A new pleasure sprouts on the Kadamba trees, and every branch shakes in a gaiety unexplained,. Every flower of Ketaki is blossomed
as if the forest has laughed. And peacocks dance with a precipitate joy(Canto 2)

Cooled by the touch of fresh drops of water,
And perfumed by the flower laden fragrant Lasak trees

Aye! scented sweet by the Ketaki pollen,
the pleasing wind enraptures the lovelorn women.(Canto 2).

Adaptations
Playwright and theatre director, Ratan Thiyam, stage his production based on the poem as closing production of 4th Bharat Rang Mahotsav in 2002.

Translations
Ritusamhara was translated into English by R. S. Pandit, published in 1947
Ritusamhara was translated into Tamil and published in 1950 by T. Sathasiva Iyer

Ritusamhara has been translated into Marathi Poetry by Dhananjay Borkar and published by Varada Prakashan in 2012.It has also been translated to Kannada by Bannanje Govindacharya titled "Rutugala henige"

Ritusmahara has been simultaneously translated into Hindi and English, as well as illustrated by Rangeya Raghav, published by Atmaram and Sons in 1973

See also
 Sanskrit literature
 Sanskrit drama

References

External links
Transliterated text at GRETIL
 Online literal translation by Desiraju Hanumanta Rao
 The Seasons, selected verses translated into English verse by Arthur W. Ryder

Works by Kalidasa
Sanskrit poetry
Ancient Indian poems